Osceola Municipal Airport  is a city-owned, public-use airport located two miles (3 km) south of the central business district of Osceola, a city in St. Clair County, Missouri, United States.

Facilities and aircraft 

For the 12-month period ending June 12, 2007, the airport had 470 general aviation aircraft operations, an average of 39 per month. At that time there were 5 single-engine aircraft based at this airport.

References

External links 

Airports in Missouri
Buildings and structures in St. Clair County, Missouri